Kärt Hellerma (born in Tallinn on 9 November 1956) is an Estonian journalist, writer, and literary critic. She has written children's books, novels, a travelogue, and short stories.

She graduated from University of Tartu, majoring in journalism.

Before becoming full time writer, she was a journalist.

Selected works
 2010: children's book Õrnad kõrvad ('Sensitive Ears') 
 2012: children's book Taevarändurid ja teisi jutte ('Pilgrims of the Sky and Other Stories')

References

1956 births
Living people
Estonian women journalists
Estonian women writers
Estonian women poets
Estonian women short story writers
Estonian editors
Estonian women editors
Estonian literary critics
Women literary critics
Estonian children's writers
Estonian women children's writers
20th-century Estonian poets
21st-century Estonian poets
20th-century Estonian novelists
21st-century Estonian novelists
University of Tartu alumni
Writers from Tallinn